Johann Parler the Younger (c. 1359 – 1405/06), was a Bohemian architect of German origin from the prominent Parler family of architects, master builders, and sculptors. He was the son of famous Gothic architect Peter Parler, the builder of Saint Vitus Cathedral and Charles Bridge in Prague.  His uncle (i.e. Peter’s brother) was Johannes von Gmünd also known as Johann Parler the Elder, a German Gothic master builder who was architect of Freiburg Minster and also rebuilt the damaged Basel Minster.

Johann Parler was born in Prague where he received his education. He worked alongside is father and older brother Wenzel Parler on St. Vitus. In 1398, he is first mentioned as the cathedral's master builder. After his father died in 1399, Johann continued work on St. Vitus Cathedral. He oversaw construction of the South Tower and was probably the designer of the tracery balustrade, which completes the facade.

He then moved to Kutná Hora, where he became master builder of St. Barbara's Church. He was the first architect of the church, construction of which had already been started in 1388 but interrupted. He is the principal designer of the choir. The design of the closed wall that surrounds the choir chapels and the triangular buttresses standing in the central axis clearly follow the Parler family tradition, which became known as the "Parler style." The late Gothic Cathedral is now listed as a UNESCO World Heritage Site.

References

Further reading 
D. Libal (1978). "Die Baukunst" (in German). DIE PARLER und der schöne Stil 1350-1400. Europäische Kunst unter den Luxemburgern. Führer zur Ausstellung von Uwe Westfehling. ed. v. A. Legner. Köln: Schnütgen-Museum und Außenreferat der Museen der Stadt Köln 2. pp. 619-21.

External links 

14th-century Bohemian people
14th-century architects
Gothic architects
Czech architects
German architects
German Bohemian people
Architects from Prague
1359 births
1400s deaths